Jesse Poe (born August 5, 1975, in Louisville, Kentucky) is a songwriter and primary member of Tanakh, the musical collective. He spent a decade in Virginia, beginning in 1993; the first half of the decade was spent in Blacksburg, and relocated to Richmond where he met David Lowery and several Sound of Music Studios stalwarts.

In 2003, he moved to Italy and worked as a teacher by day. In addition to managing Tanakh, Poe has also been involved in other projects. Jesse Poe is a distant relative of the literary figure Edgar Allan Poe.

Collaborations
Poe is involved with an ambient vocal-led improv project called Crevlyn, which also features Tanakh associate Ben Scott (of Ting Ting Jahe). He is also in a folk-pop band with Tanakh bassist Michele Poulos. In addition to performing as a backup for the Anomoanon and Six Organs of Admittance, Poe has played electric guitar for the latter.

References

External links
 

1975 births
Living people
Musicians from Louisville, Kentucky
Songwriters from Kentucky